Hertella is a lichenized genus of fungi within the Placynthiaceae family.

The genus name of Hertella is in honour of Hannes Hertel (b.1939), a German botanist (Mycology, Lichenology and Bryology), Taxonomist, Curator of Lichenes/Bryophytes and former Director of the Botanische Staatssammlung München.

The genus was circumscribed by Aino Marjatta Henssen in Mycotaxon vol.22 on page 381 in 1985.

Accepted species by GBIF;
 Hertella chilensis 
 Hertella neozelandica 
 Hertella subantarctica

References

Peltigerales
Lichen genera
Peltigerales genera